The Black Watch Armoury is a Scottish baronial-style armoury in Montreal, completed in 1906 to house the 5th Regiment "Royal Highlanders of Canada" (now the Black Watch (Royal Highland Regiment) of Canada). It was previously designated a Recognized Federal Heritage Building, in 1994.

The armoury is home to the regiment's museum, which was opened on 8 November 1949 by the then-colonel of the Black Watch, Field Marshal Lord Wavell.

History
On May 9, 1963, the armoury's exterior was damaged as part of a campaign of terrorist bombings in Montreal by the Front de libération du Québec (FLQ). In March 1983, two Molotov cocktails were thrown at the building, with a communique issued to local media claiming to be on behalf of a group carrying on the revolutionary politics of the FLQ. Quebec politics came into play again in 2009, when a protest by 200 demonstrators disrupted a Remembrance Day visit to the armoury by Charles, Prince of Wales and the Duchess of Cornwall.

Black Watch (Royal Highland Regiment) of Canada Museum

Opened in 1949, the regiment's museum includes uniforms, weapons, musical instruments, maps, medals, photographs and documents that focus on the history of the regiment, the city and the Canadian armed forces.  The museum is open to members of the Regimental family as well as to the public on Tuesdays and by appointment.  The museum and archives are located at the regiment's headquarters on rue de Bleury in Montreal. The museum portrays the history of The Black Watch (Royal Highland Regiment) through a collection of regimental uniforms, accoutrements, trophies of war, and mementos.

It is currently undergoing renovations and is closed for the time being.

References

Black Watch (Royal Highland Regiment) of Canada
Armouries in Canada
Government buildings in Montreal
Downtown Montreal
Gothic Revival architecture in Montreal
Government buildings completed in 1906
National Historic Sites in Quebec
Scottish baronial architecture in Canada
1906 establishments in Quebec